The 2015 24H Series powered by Hankook was the first season of the 24H Series with drivers battling for championship points and titles. It also marked the first season with official FIA International Series’ status. Dutch agency Creventic, the organiser and promoter of the series, organises 24-hour and 12-hour races since 2006, but the first year with multiple races was 2008 and therefore 2008 is officially the first season of the 24H Series, so this is the eighth season of the series. The races were contested with GT3-spec cars, GT4-spec cars, sports cars, touring cars and 24H-Specials, like silhouette cars.

Calendar

Entry list

Pragma:no-cache

Results and standings

Race results

Scoring system

Each driver's and team's lowest-scoring round was dropped from their total.

Drivers' Championships (Top 10)

A6

Notes
 – Jaromír Jiřík, Peter Kox, Matteo Malucelli and Jiří Písařík finished 6th overall, but 4th in the A6-Pro class at the 24H Dubai. Two A6-Am class entries were classified higher than Jiřík, Kox, Malucelli and Písařík, but after the merge of the A6-Pro and A6-Am classes they retained their points awarded for their 4th position.

997

Notes
 Drivers denoted by † did not complete sufficient laps in order to score points.

SP2

Notes
 Drivers denoted by † did not complete sufficient laps in order to score points.

SP3

A5/D2
Creventic decided after the season ended to split the diesel-powered cars from the gasoline-powered cars creating the D2 class. Although they are separate classes, if for example the highest classified D2 class entry finishes one position in front of the highest classified A5 class entry, the A5 class entry will not receive points for 1st position.

Notes
 – At the 12H Zandvoort there were only three A3T class entries. They were put in the A5 class due to the low amount of entries and therefore the A3T class was a class within the A5 class itself. At the last two rounds of the season the CUP1 class entries were put in the A5 class due to a low amount of entries and therefore the CUP1 class was also a class within the A5 class itself. In cases where A3T class entries at Zandvoort or CUP1 class entries at the last two races finished in front of an A5 class entry, it is denoted by this . If an A3T class or CUP1 class entry finished in front of an A5 class entry, the drivers of the A5 class entry would not receive more points. For example: the A3T class No. 205 Team Altran entry won in the A5 class at Zandvoort and the A5 class No. 75 Hofor-Kuepper Racing entry finished 2nd, but the drivers of the No. 75 Hofor-Kuepper Racing entry were awarded points for 2nd position, despite being the highest classified A5 class entry. This also applies to the D2 class.
 Drivers denoted by † did not complete sufficient laps in order to score points.

A3T
At the 12H Zandvoort there were only three A3T class entries. They were put in the A5 class due to the low amount of entries and therefore the A3T class was a class within the A5 class itself. The position in the A5 class decided the number of points awarded, not the position in the A3T class.

CUP1
At the last two rounds of the season the CUP1 class entries were put in the A5 class due to a low amount of entries and therefore the CUP1 class was a class within the A5 class itself. The position in the A5 class decided the number of points awarded, not the position in the CUP1 class.

A2/D1
Creventic decided after the season ended to split the diesel-powered cars from the gasoline-powered cars creating the D1 class. Although they are separate classes, if for example the highest classified D1 class entry finishes one position in front of the highest classified A2 class entry, the A2 class entry will not receive points for 1st position. This applies to all rounds of the season with the exception of the 24H Barcelona.

Notes
 Drivers denoted by † did not complete sufficient laps in order to score points.

Overall

Notes
 Drivers denoted by † did not complete sufficient laps in order to score points.

Ladies' Cup

Teams' Championships (Top 5)

A6

Notes
 – The #4 Scuderia Praha finished 6th overall, but 4th in the A6-Pro class at the 24H Dubai. Two A6-Am class entries were classified higher than the #4 Scuderia Praha but after the merge of the A6-Pro and A6-Am classes the entry retained its points awarded for their 4th position.
Pragma:no-cache

997

SP2

Notes
 – The team and its drivers of the #150 GC Automobile were ineligible to score points at the 24H Paul Ricard for unknown reasons.

SP3

A5/D2
Creventic decided after the season ended to split the diesel-powered cars from the gasoline-powered cars creating the D2 class. Although they are separate classes, if for example the highest classified D2 class entry finishes one position in front of the highest classified A5 class entry, the A5 class entry will not receive points for 1st position.

Notes
 – At the 12H Zandvoort there were only three A3T class entries. They were put in the A5 class due to the low amount of entries and therefore the A3T class was a class within the A5 class itself. At the last two rounds of the season the CUP1 class entries were put in the A5 class due to a low amount of entries and therefore the CUP1 class was also a class within the A5 class itself. In cases where A3T class entries at Zandvoort or CUP1 class entries at the last two races finished in front of an A5 class entry, it is denoted by this . If an A3T class or CUP1 class entry finished in front of an A5 class entry, the A5 class entry would not receive more points. For example: the A3T class No. 205 Team Altran entry won in the A5 class at Zandvoort and the A5 class No. 75 Hofor-Kuepper Racing entry finished 2nd, but the No. 75 Hofor-Kuepper Racing entry was awarded points for 2nd position, despite being the highest classified A5 class entry. This also applies to the D2 class.

A3T
At the 12H Zandvoort there were only three A3T class entries. They were put in the A5 class due to the low amount of entries and therefore the A3T class was a class within the A5 class itself. The position in the A5 class decided the number of points awarded, not the position in the A3T class.

CUP1
At the last two rounds of the season the CUP1 class entries were put in the A5 class due to a low amount of entries and therefore the CUP1 class was a class within the A5 class itself. The position in the A5 class decided the number of points awarded, not the position in the CUP1 class.

A2/D1
Creventic decided after the season ended to split the diesel-powered cars from the gasoline-powered cars creating the D1 class. Although they are separate classes, if for example the highest classified D1 class entry finishes one position in front of the highest classified A2 class entry, the A2 class entry will not receive points for 1st position. This applies to all rounds of the season with the exception of the 24H Barcelona.

Overall

See also
24H Series

Notes

References

External links

2015
2015 in motorsport
2015 in European sport